The 2004 Liga Premier, also known as the Dunhill Liga Premier for sponsorship reasons, is the inaugural season of the Liga Premier, the new second-tier professional football league in Malaysia.

The season was held from 14 February and concluded on 14 August 2004.

The Liga Premier champions for 2004 was MPPJ which beaten TM during the final with a score of 3–2. Both clubs were promoted to 2005 Liga Super.

League table

Group A

Group B

Goalscorers

References

Malaysia Premier League seasons
2
Malaysia
Malaysia